Eye circles are distinguished circles around the eyes, caused by either:
 Periorbital dark circles
 Periorbital puffiness

The term may also refer to the limbal rings around the iris.